Avot de-Rabbi Nathan, usually printed together with the minor tractates of the Talmud, is a Jewish aggadic work probably compiled in the geonic era (c.700–900 CE). Although Avot de-Rabbi Nathan is the first and longest of the "minor tractates", it probably does not belong in that collection chronologically, having more the character of a late midrash. In the form now extant it contains a mixture of Mishnah and Midrash, and may be technically designated as a homiletical exposition of the Mishnaic tractate Pirkei Avot, having for its foundation an older recension (version) of that tractate. It may be considered as a kind of "tosefta" or "gemarah" to the Mishna Avot, which does not possess a traditional gemarah. Avot de-Rabbi Nathan contains many teachings, proverbs, and incidents that are not found anywhere else in the early rabbinical literature. Other rabbinical sayings appear in a more informal style than what is found in Pirkei Avot.

The two existing forms (recensions) of Avot de-Rabbi Nathan 
Touching its original form, its age, and its dependence on earlier or later recensions of the Mishnah, there are many opinions, all of which are discussed in S. Schechter's introduction. There are two recensions of this work, one of which is usually printed with the Babylonian Talmud in the appendix to Seder Nezikin [the sixteenth volume], preceding the so-called Minor Treatises, and another, which, until the late 19th century, existed in manuscript only. In 1887 Solomon Schechter published the two recensions in parallel columns, contributing to the edition a critical introduction and valuable notes.  There were likely other recensions as well, since the medieval rabbis quote from other versions.

In order to distinguish the two recensions, the one printed with the Talmud may be called A; and the other, B. The former is divided into forty-one chapters, and the latter into forty-eight. Schechter has proved that recension B is cited only by Spanish authors. Rashi knows of recension A only.

A Hebrew manuscript of Avot de-Rabbi Nathan is today housed at the Bodleian Library in Oxford, England, under the classification MS Oxford (Bodleiana) Heb. c. 24. In addition, MS Parma (Palatina) 2785 (de Rossi 327; Uncastillo/Spain, 1289), being a more precise copy of Avot de-Rabbi Nathan, has been used to correct errors in recension B.

Contents 
The content of the two recensions differ from each other considerably, although the method is the same in both. The separate teachings of the Mishnah Avot are generally taken as texts, which are either briefly explained—the ethical lessons contained therein being supported by reference to Biblical passages—or fully illustrated by narratives and legends. Sometimes long digressions are made by introducing subjects connected only loosely with the text. This method may be illustrated by the following example: Commenting on the teaching of Simon the Just which designates charity as one of the three pillars on which the world rests, Avot de-Rabbi Nathan reads as follows:

The chapters of the two recensions of Avot de-Rabbi Nathan correspond with those of the Mishnah Avot as follows: 
Chapters 1-11 of recension A and chapters 1-23 of recension B correspond with Pirkei Avot 1:1-11, dealing with saying of the Zugoth.
Chapters 12-19 of A and chapters 24-29 of B correspond with Pirkei Avot 1:12-18 and chapter 2, dealing with the teachings of Hillel, Shammai, Yohanan ben Zakkai and his disciples
Chapters 20-30 of A and chapters 30-35 of B correspond with Pirkei Avot chapters 3-4, an independent mishnaic collection
Chapters 31-41 of A and chapters 36-48 of B correspond with Pirkei Avot chapter 5, a collection of anonymous statements related by form

Authorship 

Nathan the Babylonian, whose name appears in the title of the work under treatment, cannot possibly have been its only author, since he flourished about the middle of the 2nd century, or a generation prior to the author of the Mishnah. Besides, several authorities are quoted who flourished a long time after R. Nathan; for instance, Rabbi Joshua ben Levi. The designation "De-Rabbi Nathan" may be explained by the circumstance that R. Nathan is one of the first authorities mentioned in the opening chapter of the work (but not the first, that being Yose ha-Galili). Perhaps the school of the tannaite R. Nathan originated the work, however.  Probably due to political differences that Rabbi Nathan had with Shimon ben Gamliel, Rabbi Nathan's name does not appear in the version of Avot compiled by redactor of the Mishna Rebbi (the son of the aforementioned  Shimon ben Gamliel).  However, it is known that Rabbi Nathan made an independent collection , and it is possible that Avot de-Rabbi Nathan derives from that source.

It is also called Tosefta to Avot. The two recensions of the work in their present shape evidently have different authors, but who they were cannot be ascertained. Probably they belonged to the period of the Geonim, between the 8th and 9th centuries.

Translations
A Latin translation of Abot de-Rabbi Nathan was published by Franz Tayler, London, 1654: Tractatus de Patribus Rabbi Nathan Auctore, in Linguam Latinam Translatus.
An English version is given by M. L. Rodkinson in his translation of the Babylonian Talmud, i. 9, New York, 1900.
The Fathers According to Rabbi Nathan, translated by Judah Goldin, Yale University Press, 1955. (reprinted 1990)
 'Aboth d'Rabbi Nathan, translated into English with Introduction and Notes, by Eli Cashdan, in The Minor Tractates of the Talmud, Soncino, 1965.
Fathers According to Rabbi Nathan: Abot De Rabbi Nathan, Anthony J. Saldarini,  Brill Academic, 1975.
The Fathers According to Rabbi Nathan, Jacob Neusner, University of South Florida Press, 1986.

Commentaries
Schechter gives the commentaries to Avot de-Rabbi Nathan in his edition. Emendations were made by Benjamin Motal. Commentaries have been written by Eliezer Lipman of Zamość, Zolkiev, 1723; by Elijah ben Abraham with notes by the Vilna Gaon, by Abraham Witmand, and by Joshua Falk Lisser. Lisser's edition is reprinted in the Vilna Talmud.

References 

.
. The JE cites the following works
Leopold Zunz, Gottesdienstliche Vorträge der Juden,, 1st ed., pp. 108 et seq.;
Solomon Taussig, Neweh Shalom I, Munich, 1872, in which pamphlet a part of Abot de-Rabbi Nathan, recension B, was for the first time published, according to a manuscript of the Munich Library;
Solomon Schechter, Abot de-Rabbi Nathan, Vienna, 1887;
Monatsschrift, 1887, pp. 374–383;
Moritz Steinschneider, Hebr. Bibl. xii. 75 et seq.
Moritz Steinschneider, Cat. Bodl. col. 2034;
Isaac ben Jacob Benjacob, Oẓar ha-Sefarim, p. 654.

External links 
Avot de-Rabbi Natan, Schechter edition (Vienna, 1887) (full original text of both versions, with introduction and scholarly notes)
Jewish Encyclopedia article for Avot of Rabbi Nathan
Full Hebrew text of Avot of Rabbi Natan
 Latin translation of Avot of Rabbi Nathan

8th-century texts
9th-century texts
Aggadic Midrashim
Jewish texts
Minor tractates
Texts in Hebrew
Sifrei Kodesh